The Allahabad–Dehradun Link Express is an Express train belonging to North Central Railway zone that runs between  and  in India. It is currently being operated with  14113/14114 train numbers on a daily basis.

Service

The 14113/Link Express has an average speed of 45 km/h and covers 865 km in  19h 25m. The 14114/Link Express has an average speed of 46 km/hr and covers 865 km in 18h 55m.

Route and stops 

The important stops of the train are:

Allahabad Junction railway station
 
Manauri railway station

Coach composition

The train has standard ICF rakes with a maximum speed of 110 km/h. The train consists of 12 coaches:

 1 first AC 
 1 first AC and second AC
 5 sleeper coaches
 3 general
 2 seating cum luggage rake

Traction

Both trains are hauled by a Kanpur Loco Shed-based WAP-4 or WAP-1 electric locomotive from Allahabad to Aligarh. From Aligarh it is hauled by a Tughlakabad Loco Shed-based WDP-4D diesel locomotive until Dehradun and back.

Schedule
14114/14114- runs daily for both the direction

Direction reversal

The train reverses its direction:

Rake sharing

The train shares its rake with 14120/14119 Kathgodam–Dehradun Express and it is bounded to 14163/14164 Sangam Express at Aligarh to complete its journey until Allahabad.

See also 

 Allahabad Junction railway station
 Aligarh Junction railway station
 Dehradun railway station
 Sangam Express
 Kathgodam–Dehradun Express

Notes

References

External links 

 14113/Link Express
 14114/Link Express

Trains from Allahabad
Trains from Dehradun
Express trains in India
Railway services introduced in 1989